Philippe LaRoche (born December 12, 1966) is a Canadian freestyle skier and Olympic medalist. He received a silver medal at the 1994 Winter Olympics in Lillehammer, in aerials.

He finished first in the aerials (demonstration event) at the 1992 Winter Olympics in Albertville.

He is from, and still lives in Lac Beauport, Quebec, Canada.

References

External links
 

1966 births
Living people
Canadian male freestyle skiers
Freestyle skiers at the 1994 Winter Olympics
Olympic silver medalists for Canada
Olympic medalists in freestyle skiing
Medalists at the 1994 Winter Olympics
Sportspeople from Quebec